Marlin Hills is an unincorporated community in Bloomington Township, Monroe County, in the U.S. state of Indiana.

Geography

References

Unincorporated communities in Monroe County, Indiana
Unincorporated communities in Indiana
Bloomington, Indiana